David Andrews (born 15 March 1935) is a former Irish Fianna Fáil politician who served as Minister for Foreign Affairs from 1992 to 1993 and 1997 to 2000, Minister for Defence from 1993 to 1994 and June 1997 to October 1997, Minister for the Marine from 1993 to 1994, Minister of State at the Department of Foreign Affairs from 1977 to 1979 and Government Chief Whip and Minister of State at the Department of Defence from 1970 to 1973. He served as a Teachta Dála (TD) from 1965 to 2002.

Andrews was first elected to Dáil Éireann at the 1965 general election as a Fianna Fáil TD for the Dún Laoghaire and Rathdown constituency. In May 1970, in a reshuffle following the Arms Crisis, he was appointed as Parliamentary Secretary to the Taoiseach, with special responsibility as Chief Whip, and Parliamentary Secretary to the Minister for Defence. He served until Fianna Fáil left office in 1973.

Following the 1977 general election, Fianna Fáil were back in office and Jack Lynch appointed Andrews as Parliamentary Secretary to the Minister for Foreign Affairs. In the 1979 Fianna Fáil leadership election Andrews supported George Colley, the favoured candidate of the existing leadership. However, Charles Haughey, in a very close vote, was elected party leader and Taoiseach.

Andrews was confined to the backbenches during Haughey's thirteen-year period as leader. During this period he maintained his legal practice and campaigned for the Guildford Four, the Birmingham Six, and Brian Keenan. He remained a vocal critic of Haughey during this period. After the Progressive Democrats were founded in 1985 Andrews considered joining the new party. In February 1992, Albert Reynolds succeeded Haughey as Taoiseach, and Andrews was appointed as Minister for Foreign Affairs. In January 1993, following the formation of a coalition with the Labour Party, Andrews was appointed as Minister for Defence and Minister for the Marine. He served until this government fell in December 1994.

After the 1997 general election, Fianna Fáil returned to office in coalition with the Progressive Democrats, with Bertie Ahern as Taoiseach. Andrews was first appointed Minister for Defence; later that year, after the resignation of Ray Burke, he was appointed as Minister for Foreign Affairs. His period as Foreign Minister was successful regarding the Northern Ireland peace talks. In April 1998, the Good Friday Agreement was signed and was later approved in referendums in the Ireland and Northern Ireland. In 1999, Ireland joined the Partnership for Peace project. Andrews stepped down as Minister for Foreign Affairs in January 2000.

He retired from politics at the 2002 general election, and his son Barry was elected for the Dún Laoghaire constituency. His other son David Andrews, Jnr is a comedian who works under the stage name of David McSavage. His brother Niall Andrews was a TD and MEP. On retirement from politics, he was appointed Chairman of the insurance company, MGM International.

In May 2000, he was appointed to the non-executive position as Chairman of the Irish Red Cross Society, serving in that position until 2009.

See also
Families in the Oireachtas

References

 

1935 births
Living people
Alumni of the University of Galway
David
Fianna Fáil TDs
Government Chief Whip (Ireland)
Irish barristers
Members of the 18th Dáil
Members of the 19th Dáil
Members of the 20th Dáil
Members of the 21st Dáil
Members of the 22nd Dáil
Members of the 23rd Dáil
Members of the 24th Dáil
Members of the 25th Dáil
Members of the 26th Dáil
Members of the 27th Dáil
Members of the 28th Dáil
Ministers for Defence (Ireland)
Ministers for Foreign Affairs (Ireland)
Ministers of State of the 21st Dáil
Parliamentary Secretaries of the 19th Dáil
People from Dún Laoghaire
Politicians from County Dublin
People educated at Synge Street CBS